The 2009 USA Outdoor Track and Field Championships took place between June 25–28 at Hayward Field in Eugene, Oregon. The competition acted as a way of selecting the United States team for the 2009 World Championships in Athletics in Berlin later that year.

Results

Men track events

Men field events

Women track events

Women field events

See also
United States Olympic Trials (track and field)

External links
USATF competition website
Full results from USATF 

USA Outdoor Track and Field Championships
Usa Outdoor Track And Field Championships, 2009
Track and field
2009 in sports in Oregon
Track and field in Oregon